The Favorite (Spanish:El caballo del pueblo) is a 1935  Argentine musical film comedy directed and written by Manuel Romero with Luis Bayón Herrera. It is a tango film and premiered on August 15, 1935.

The cinematography and editing  was performed by Francisco Múgica.

Main cast
Olinda Bozán as Ruperta
Irma Córdoba as Esther Peña
Enrique Serrano as Bebe Viñas
Pedro Quartucci as Flaco
Juan Carlos Thorry as Roberto Campos
Juan Mangiante as Peña
Juan Porta as Trainer
Eduardo Lema as Lemos, the jockey
Vicente Forastieri as Contreras
N. Fornaresio as Peon
Lalo Malcolm as a Thug (billed as L. Malcom)
Nicolás Werenchuk as José Guzmán (billed as N. Werenchuk)
Mary Parets as Trainer's daughter
Ángel Magaña as Young Man #1 in party (uncredited)
Pedro Maratea as Young Man #2 in party (uncredited)
Margarita Padín as Young Woman in show (uncredited)

External links

1935 films
Argentine musical comedy films
1930s Spanish-language films
Argentine black-and-white films
Tango films
Films directed by Manuel Romero
1935 musical comedy films
1930s Argentine films